The 1992-93 Turkish First Football League season had 16 teams in competition. Galatasaray S.K. won the championship.

League table

Results

Top scorers

References

 Turkey - List of final tables (RSSSF)

Süper Lig seasons
1992–93 in Turkish football
Turkey